Martin Luther King Jr. is an outdoor bronze sculpture depicting the American civil rights leader of the same name by Jeffrey Varilla and Anna Koh-Varilla, installed on the University of Texas at Austin campus, in Austin, Texas. The statue was installed in September 1999. Efforts to erect a monument were initiated by a group of students, who formed the Martin Luther King Jr. Sculpture Foundation in 1987.

See also

 1999 in art
 Civil rights movement in popular culture
 Dr. Martin Luther King Jr. (Blome sculpture), Milwaukee, Wisconsin
 Martin Luther King Jr. (Wilson sculpture), Washington, D.C.
 Statue of Martin Luther King Jr. (Houston)

References

1999 establishments in Texas
1999 sculptures
Bronze sculptures in Texas
Memorials to Martin Luther King Jr.
Monuments and memorials in Texas
Outdoor sculptures in Austin, Texas
Sculptures of Martin Luther King Jr.
Sculptures of men in Texas
Statues in Austin, Texas
University of Texas at Austin campus